The English Way ( and ) is one of the paths of the Camino de Santiago. It begins in the Galician port cities of Ferrol (118 km) or A Coruña (75 km) and runs south to Santiago de Compostela.

Middle Ages
The English Way was a path of convenience for medieval pilgrims to reach Santiago de Compostela. Pilgrims from Scandinavia or other areas of Northern Europe would travel by ship instead of by foot or horseback. At least one Icelandic pilgrim is known to have followed this path in 1154. During times of conflict between France and other countries, especially England, this alternative saw exceptional traffic. During the Hundred Years' War (1337–1453) between the Kingdom of England and the Kingdom of France, the English Way became well-established as English pilgrims and traders would travel with permission of the English Crown to Galician ports and visit Santiago. Known pilgrim hospitals with significant English support were located in Sigüeiro, San Paio, Pontedeume, Betanzos, Bruma, Neda, Miño and Paderne.

Modern Revival
In the modern era the English Way has been revived as a much briefer alternative to the classic French Way. In order to receive the Compostela, the official certificate issued by the Cathedral of Santiago to confirm that a person has completed their pilgrimage, a minimum walk of 100 km is required. Only Ferrol is this distant on the English Way.  There is a marker on the docks of Ferrol across from the Tourist Information building which announces this fact. Modern public albergues are located in Neda, Pontedeume, Miño, Betanzos, Presedo and Bruma.

However, as of December 2016, the Cathedral of Santiago has agreed to grant the Compostela to those starting in A Coruña subject to certain conditions: they are required to complete a 25 km certified pilgrimage in their country of origin.

In 2018, 14,150 pilgrims (4.32% of the total number of pilgrims arriving to the Pilgrims' Reception Office of the Cathedral of Santiago de Compostela) walked the English Way.

References

Camino de Santiago routes